Expansive Heart is the debut EP and only release of California punk band Big Rig. It was released July 12, 1994 on Lookout! Records. In 2020, Oakland, California record label 1-2-3-4 Go! Records announced they would be re-releasing 1000 copies of the EP on vinyl.

Track listing

Personnel 
Credits adapted from EP liner notes and Discogs.

Big Rig
Jesse Michaels – lead vocals
Doug Sangalang – guitar, vocals 
Kevin Cross – guitar, vocals 
Jeremy Goody – bass, vocals 
Brandon Riggen – drums, vocals 

Production
Andy Ernst – engineering, production
Big Rig – production

References

External links
Operationivy.org, with info about Big Rig as well as other related bands

Big Rig (band) albums
1994 EPs